Christián Muñoz Ortega (born July 14, 1959) is a Chilean sport shooter. He competed at the 2000 Summer Olympics, placing 36th in the men's 50 metre pistol event and 40th in the men's 10 metre air pistol event.

References

1959 births
Living people
ISSF pistol shooters
Chilean male sport shooters
Olympic shooters of Chile
Shooters at the 2000 Summer Olympics